Presidential elections were held in South Korea on 18 December 1992, the second democratic presidential elections since the end of military rule in 1987. Voter turnout was 81.9%.

In the first regular presidential election with no military candidates since 1960, Kim Young-sam of the ruling Democratic Liberal Party won with 41 percent of the vote.

Background
On 22 January 1990, two opposition leaders Kim Young-Sam and Kim Jong-Pil led their parties to merge into the ruling party Democratic Justice Party, and formed the Democratic Liberal Party, led by President Roh Tae-woo. Before they merged, Roh's party did not have a majority in the National Assembly. After they merged, they had over a two-thirds majority, which could pass bills without any obstruction from the opposition. Roh could not run for re-election due to the constitution limiting the president to a single five-year term.

Kim Dae-jung, an opponent in the 1987 election who finished third behind Kim Young-sam and Roh Tae-woo ran again in 1992. Hyundai businessman Chung Ju-yung also ran in the election.

Nominations

Democratic Liberal Party 
The Democratic Liberal Party national convention was held on 19 May at the Olympic Gymnastics Arena. Nine-term lawmaker from Busan Kim Young-sam won the nomination, defeating four-term lawmaker from Seoul Lee Jong-chan, who did not concede and ran as a third party candidate. Lee Jong-chan withdrew his campaign and endorsed RNP nominee Chung Ju-yung in December.

Democratic Party 
The Democratic National Convention was held from 25 to 26 May at the Olympic Fencing Gymnasium. At the convention, Kim Dae-jung, 6-term lawmaker from South Jeolla, defeated Lee Ki-taek, 7-term lawmaker from Busan, and won the nomination.

Of 2,426 delegates present at the convention, 1,443 had been from Kim's faction and only 983 from Lee's, so Kim was thought as the presumptive nominee even before the convention began.

Unification National Party
At the UNP National Convention held on 15 May at the KOEX in Seoul, Chung Ju-yung was nominated for president by a yay-nay rising vote.

Results
The right-wing conservative Democratic Liberal Party presidential candidate Kim Young-Sam won the presidential election, defeating opposition Democratic Party leader Kim Dae-Jung, marking the third time he had lost a presidential election. Kim later announced his retirement from politics.

The conservative ruling party won the election continued to govern until 1997 when Kim Dae-Jung won the next presidential election.

By region

References

Presidential elections in South Korea
South Korea
Presidential
Kim Young-sam
Kim Dae-jung